Bryce Postles (22 February 1931 – 19 January 2011) was a New Zealand cricketer. He played nineteen first-class matches for Auckland between 1952 and 1957.

See also
 List of Auckland representative cricketers

References

External links
 

1931 births
2011 deaths
New Zealand cricketers
Auckland cricketers
Cricketers from Auckland